Luca Tosi (born 4 November 1992) is a San Marino international footballer who plays as a midfielder for Virtus.

References

1992 births
Living people
People from Rimini
Sammarinese footballers
San Marino under-21 international footballers
San Marino international footballers
Association football midfielders
S.S. Folgore Falciano Calcio players
Sammarinese people of Italian descent